Ye-ji, also spelled Yea-ji,  is a Korean feminine given name. Its meaning differs based on the hanja used to write each syllable of the name. There are 34 hanja with the reading "ye" and 46 hanja with the reading "ji" on the South Korean government's official list of hanja which may be used in given names.

People with this name include:
Shin Yea-ji (figure skater born 1984), South Korean figure skater
Shin Yea-ji (figure skater born 1988), South Korean figure skater
Seo Yea-ji (born 1990), South Korean actress
Kwak Ye-ji (born 1992), South Korean archer
Kim Ye-ji (born 1994), South Korean rower
Yezi (born Lee Ye-ji, 1994), South Korean singer, former member of Fiestar
Yun Yea-ji (born 1994), South Korean figure skater
Seol Ye-ji (born 1996), South Korean curler
Jung Ye-ji, South Korean actress
Yaeji, Korean-American DJ and singer

See also
List of Korean given names

References

Korean feminine given names